One-room schools, or schoolhouses, were commonplace throughout rural portions of various countries, including Prussia, Norway, Sweden, the United States, Canada, Australia, New Zealand, the United Kingdom, Ireland, and Spain. In most rural and small town schools, all of the students met in a single room. There, a single teacher taught academic basics to several grade levels of elementary-age children. While in many areas one-room schools are no longer used, some remain in developing nations and rural or remote areas.

In the United States, the concept of a "little red schoolhouse" is a stirring one, and historic one-room schoolhouses have widely been preserved and are celebrated as symbols of frontier values and of local and national development.  When necessary, the schools were enlarged or replaced with two-room schools. More than 200 are listed on the U.S. National Register of Historic Places.  In Norway, by contrast, one-room schools were viewed more as impositions upon conservative farming areas, and, while a number survive in open-air museums, not a single one is listed on the Norwegian equivalent to the NRHP.

Prussia

Prussia was among the first countries in the world to introduce a tax-funded and generally compulsory primary education for either boys and girls. In comparison, compulsory schooling in France or Great Britain was not successfully enacted until the 1880s. The state-sponsored system was introduced in the late 18th century and has had a widespread influence ever since. The first Prussian schools were simple one-room schools, but by 1773 Friedrich Eberhard von Rochow had already set up a model school with primary education in two separate age-grouped classes.

Ireland

In Ireland, free primary education was mandated in 1831, prompting the establishment of many single-teacher National Schools across rural areas, most initially using a room in an existing building.  By the 1890s there was a school in every parish.  Most extant one- and two-room school buildings date from the decades after 1891 when primary education became compulsory.  Most of those still in use today have been extended following merger with neighbouring schools.  Since 2002, any state-funded school with at least 10 pupils is entitled to at least 2 teachers; the 21 schools which fell below this threshold are located on offshore islands. In recent decades, an increasing number of schools have been founded for parents not content with the National School system.  These include Gaelscoileanna (which teach through Irish rather than English) and multi-denominational schools (most Irish schools are controlled by one or other of the main Christian churches). Although such schools eventually become eligible for state funding, they usually begin with a single teacher in a room or prefabricated building.

United States

Many schools also served as the local chapel on Sundays, and evening/Saturday meeting places for local people and activities. Being mostly rural, many schools had no plumbing or sanitation. Teaching standards often varied from school to school as the teacher was compelled to coach children of all ages/grades within one room and regardless of their area of main competence.

The quality of facilities at one-room schools varied with local economic conditions, but generally, the number of children at each grade level would vary with local populations. Most buildings were of simple frame construction, some with the school bell on a cupola. In the Midwest, sod construction was also used, as well as stone and adobe in areas like the Southwest where trees were scarce. In some locations, the schoolhouse was painted red, but most seem to have been white. 

Mission Ridge School was one of the early schools in Mason County, West Virginia. It has since been moved to the West Virginia State Farm Museum complex near Point Pleasant. Examination of the materials in this building indicates that boards and timbers were hand-sawed and also hand-planed. Square nails were used throughout the building. Except for the roof and a few boards in the floor, all of the material in this building is original. The blackboard is painted black. It was not until much later that slate was used for chalkboards, although students often had individual slates for writing practice.

Teachers in one-room schools were often former students themselves. Their role is well-described by a student from Kentucky in the 1940s:
The teachers that taught in the one room, rural schools were very special people. During the winter months they would get to the school early to get a fire started in the potbelly stove, so the building would be warm for the students. On many occasions they would prepare a hot, noon meal on top of the stove, usually consisting of soup or stew of some kind. They took care of their students like a new mother hen would care for her newly hatched chicks; always looking out for their health and welfare.

A typical school day was 9 a.m. to 4 p.m., with morning and afternoon recesses of 15 minutes each and an hour period for lunch. "The older students were given the responsibility of bringing in water, carrying in coal or wood for the stove. The younger students would be given responsibilities according to their size and gender such as cleaning the black board (chalkboard), taking the erasers outside for dusting plus other duties that they were capable of doing."

Transportation for children who lived too far to walk was often provided by horse-drawn kid hack or sulky, which could only travel a limited distance in a reasonable amount of time each morning and evening, or students might ride a horse, these being put out to pasture in an adjoining paddock during the day. In more recent times, students rode bicycles.

Southern students and teachers most often walked to and from school; a three-mile journey was not uncommon. Due to the poor quality of roads, automobiles were not frequently used.

The school house was the center and focus for thousands of rural communities, hamlets, and small towns. Often, town meetings and picnics were also held there.

The vast majority of one-room schools in the United States are no longer used as schools and have either been torn down or converted for other purposes.  However, in some rural communities, including among the Amish, one-room or two-room schools are still used, primarily for elementary education, with students graduating to local or regional middle and high schools.

As of 2005, almost 400 one-rooms schools still operate in the United States.

Octagonal schoolhouses

There are several historic one-room schoolhouses in the United States that were built in the shape of an octagon, instead of the more traditional rectangular style. Most are located in the northeastern part of the country and some have been restored and placed on the National Register of Historic Places.

The following octagonal schoolhouses still stand:

 Sheldon Jackson School; Sitka, Alaska
 Octagonal Schoolhouse; Cowgill's Corner, Delaware
 Birmingham School; Chester County, Pennsylvania
 Charter Oak Schoolhouse; Schuline, Illinois
 Watkins Mill Schoolhouse; Lawson, Missouri
 Modern Times School; Brentwood, New York
 
 Eight Square Schoolhouse; Dryden, New York
 Octagonal Schoolhouse; Essex, New York
 Octagon Stone Schoolhouse; Canaan, Pennsylvania
 Sodom Schoolhouse; Montandon, Pennsylvania
 Hood Octagonal School; Newtown Township, Pennsylvania
 Diamond Rock Schoolhouse; Tredyffrin Township, Chester County, Pennsylvania
 Wrightstown Octagonal Schoolhouse; Wrightstown, Pennsylvania

Teacher's residence

The teacher's residence, or teacherage, was often attached to the school, or very close by, so that a male teacher's wife and family were an integral part of the management and support system for the school. Single, female teachers were more often billeted or boarded with a local family to provide for social norms requiring social supervision of single females.

Consolidation
Motorized school buses in the 1920s made longer distances possible, and one-room schools were soon consolidated in most portions of the United States into multiple classroom schools where classes could be held separately for various grade levels. Gradually, one-room school houses were replaced. Most one-room schools had been replaced by larger schools by World War II except in the most rural areas. However, they are still common in rural parts of Alaska.

Preservation: buildings and cultural

In Calvert County, Maryland, Port Republic School Number 7 closed its doors in 1932 and sat unused for over 40 years. Then, in 1976 the Calvert Retired Teachers Association, looking for a Bicentennial Year project, decided to restore the one-room schoolhouse. On July 24, 1977, after months of hard work by teachers and community volunteers, the old school bell rang out once more, and the little one-room school house, filled with its memories and memorabilia, was ready for visitors. It is now one of the county's tourist attractions. A similar project was done in Queen Anne's County, Maryland, by retired Teachers and Community Volunteers.  The restored schoolhouse is located in front of Queen Anne's County High School. In Iowa, over 125 small one-room school houses have been turned into local museums. The buildings in some places found new purpose as homes.

In Harrisburg, Nebraska, Flowerfield School serves as a living museum, and fourth-graders within the Nebraska panhandle spend a day at Flowerfield going through an average school day in 1888. The students have the opportunity to experience both log and sod versions of the house, writing with quill pens, and a trip to the nearby museum, where they learn about other aspects of life in 1888.

In Vandalia, Indiana, the Vandalia District # 2 one-room schoolhouse served Owen County's Lafayette Township students in grades 1 – 8 from the time it was completed in 1868 until it closed in 1951. The building, restored by a group of volunteers in 1976, is presently maintained and preserved by the Vandalia Community Preservation Association.

The One Room School House Project of Southwestern College in Winfield, Kansas, includes listings and information on some 880 schools throughout the state and nation. The information, pictures, and stories included in this site have been collected and sent to the project by researchers and historians from across America.

Gallery

See also

 A-b-c-darian, the youngest students in a one-room school
 Blab school
 Kansas one room school
 Micro-schooling
 Ranch school
 Ungraded school
 One-room jail

References

Further reading

External links

Audio Interview with 1920 student in 1820 1-room schoolhouse in E. Fishkill, NY (55 min.)
One Room School Houses in the Ottawa Valley
CSAA a National One-Room Schoolhouse Support Organization
One Room School House Project of Southwestern College
University of Northern Iowa - One-room School Museum

 
School types
History of education